Ferenc Juhász (born 6 July 1960 in Nyíregyháza) is a former Minister of Defence for Hungary. From 1990, he has been a member of the Hungarian Socialist Party (MSZP), and from 2000 the vice chairman of the party. He was the Minister of National Defense in Hungary from 27 May 2002 to 9 June 2006. He was also Member of Parliament between 1994 and 2014.

The Central Prosecutor's Office opened an investigation on suspicion of embezzlement against Juhász and his former State Secretary László Fapál on 13 July 2012. According to the indictment Juhász undersold a ministry-owned apartment to Fapál around 2005 or 2006, which caused an estimated damage of 43 million Ft to the Ministry of Defence. Juhász told MTI his accusation was "obviously acting on political pressure". In February 2014, both politicians were acquitted.

Personal life
He is married. His wife is Csilla Szendrák.

References

Sources 
 www.juhaszferenc.hu

1960 births
Living people
People from Nyíregyháza
Defence ministers of Hungary
Hungarian Socialist Party politicians
Members of the National Assembly of Hungary (1994–1998)
Members of the National Assembly of Hungary (1998–2002)
Members of the National Assembly of Hungary (2002–2006)
Members of the National Assembly of Hungary (2006–2010)
Members of the National Assembly of Hungary (2010–2014)